Bolbula is a genus of praying mantises in the family Nanomantidae.

See also
List of mantis genera and species

References

 
Nanomantidae
Mantodea genera